Mexifornia (also Calexico or Califaztlán) is a portmanteau of Mexico and California.

Description
Mexifornia refers to what some see as the Mexicanization/Hispanicization of the U.S. state of California as a result of increased documented and undocumented migration of Mexican and other Hispanic people into California and the transformation of many aspects of the culture of the state.

Mexifornia is seen as a state level version of what is now known as Amexica, the merging of America and Mexico;
"The United States of "Amexica" share more than a border and a common heritage: both sides welcome the benefits of trade but struggle with the pressures of growth". Time magazine.

This is a topic of a heated debate between the advocates of amnesty for illegal immigrants on one side and those wishing to enforce immigration laws on the other side.

Popular culture
 Mexifornia is the main setting of the cartoon Bordertown.

See also
 Anti-Mexican sentiment
 Chicano
 Chicano Movement
 Chicano nationalism
 Immigration to the United States
 La Raza
 Reconquista (Mexico)
 Southern Border Region (California)
 Mexicali

References
 "A Country of 24 Million". Time magazine, vol. 157, no. 23, p. 46, June 11, 2001.
 Mexifornia: A State of Becoming by Victor Davis Hanson 
 Mexifornia: A State of Confusion a Commentary by Walter A. Ewing, Ph.D

External links
 Booknotes interview with Victor Davis Hanson on Mexifornia: A State of Becoming, September 28, 2003.

California culture
Mexican culture
.
1990s neologisms